Little Village is the only studio album by the band Little Village. The band, a super-group comprising Ry Cooder, John Hiatt, Nick Lowe and Jim Keltner, released the album, went on a tour of the US and Europe to support it, and disbanded the year of its release. They had previously worked as a group while recording Hiatt's solo album Bring the Family in 1987. Although all songs are credited to all four group members, Hiatt sang all but three, with two sung by Lowe and one by Cooder. "She Runs Hot", "Solar Sex Panel" and "Don't Go Away Mad" were released as singles. The Solar Sex Panel EP contained a new non-album track "Do With Me What You Want to Do" written by Cooder/Hiatt/Keltner/Lowe and sung by Lowe, as well as a cover of the novelty song "Haunted House", originally released by Jumpin' Gene Simmons in 1964, and sung by Cooder. "Do with Me What You Want to Do" was also included as a B-side on the "Don't Go Away Mad" single.

At the Grammy Awards of 1993, Little Village was nominated for Best Rock Performance by a Duo or Group with Vocal.

Track listing
All songs written by Little Village and sung by John Hiatt except where noted.

Personnel
Little Village
John Hiatt – guitars, lead vocals (1, 3, 4, 6, 7, 9-11) and backing vocals, piano
Ry Cooder – guitars, backing and lead (2, 9, 11) vocals
Nick Lowe – bass guitar, backing and lead (5, 8, 9, 11) vocals
Jim Keltner – drums, percussion

Production notes
Produced by Little Village
Engineered by Ken Allardyce, Dan Bosworth, Allen Sides
Mastered by Bernie Grundman

Charts

References

1992 debut albums
Ry Cooder albums
Nick Lowe albums
John Hiatt albums
Reprise Records albums